Tupesy is a municipality and village in Uherské Hradiště District in the Zlín Region of the Czech Republic. It has about 1,100 inhabitants.

Twin towns – sister cities

Tupesy is twinned with:
 Nedašovce, Slovakia

References

Villages in Uherské Hradiště District